Mark Eric Kaplan (born November 30, 1967, in Philadelphia, Pennsylvania) is a member of the Republican Party of the U.S. state of Florida and served as Chief of Staff to Governor Jeb Bush. Previously he served in a similar capacity for Lt. Governor Toni Jennings. Kaplan received his bachelor's degree from the University of Florida in 1988 and a Juris Doctor from Florida State University in 1992.

References

External links
Notable UF alumni page
2005 article about Kaplan

Florida Republicans
1967 births
Living people
Florida State University College of Law alumni
University of Florida alumni
Chiefs of staff to United States state governors